oThongathi, alternatively rendered Tongaat, is a town in KwaZulu-Natal, South Africa, about  north of Durban and  south of KwaDukuza. It now forms part of eThekwini Metropolitan Municipality, or the Greater Durban area. The area is home to the oldest Indian community in South Africa, having been where the first indentured Indian laborers settled in 1860 to work in the sugar-cane plantations. Much of the architectural style in the town was the work of Ivan Mitford-Barberton, and many buildings are in the Cape Dutch style of architecture.

History
oThongathi was established as Tongaat in 1945 and its name was taken from the name of the uThongathi River which passes by the town: The name of the river, derived from Zulu, is said to mean  In 2017 plans were made for the restoration of the historic railway station building.

Name change
In November 2009, the eThekwini Metropolitan Municipality submitted a list of places in the municipality to the KwaZulu-Natal Provincial Geographic Names Committee to be changed from their anglicised names to the correct Zulu spelling. In the list, the town Tongaat was to be changed to "oThongathi" and the Tongaat River was to be changed to "uThongathi River". On 1 October 2010, the KwaZulu-Natal Department of Arts and Culture gazette the list of approved name changes which included the town of Tongaat and the Tongaat River.

Ever since the name change, the South African National Roads Agency Ltd. (SANRAL) has changed the road signs on the N2 leading to and at the uShukela Drive interchange (Exit 202) just outside oThongathi, however there are still several road signs that still remain with the name "Tongaat" and many Durbanites and residents of oThongathi still refer to it by its previous name.

Geography 
oThongathi is located on a gentle hilly terrain surrounded by sugarcane plantations of the uMhlanga Coast, which stretches from the uMngeni River in the south to the uThongathi River in the north and alongside oThongathi the coastal region includes Durban North, uMhlanga, Mount Edgecombe, Verulam, eMdloti, La Mercy and Westbrook.

Most of oThongathi lies south of the uThongathi River including the Central Business District (CBD), the industrial zones of Tongaat Industrial and Trurolands and the residential suburbs of Gandhi's Hill, Mitchell Village, Mithangar, Buffelsdale, Flamingo Heights, Watsonia, Vanrova, and Belvedere. In addition, the neighbouring township of Hambanathi lies on the southern banks of the river and west of the R102. Tongaat Hulett's Maidstone Sugar Mill, Maidstone Golf Club and the suburbs of Fairbreeze, Burbreeze, Newton and Sandfields all lie to the north of the uThongathi River.

Business
oThongathi's CBD is typical of small towns as it is stringed along the main road, Gopalall Hurbans Road and is bordered by the railway to the east. oThongathi's CBD includes public amenities such as a town hall, police station, library, sports centre, a Home Affairs regional office and the only hospital in the town, Mediclinic Victoria Private Hospital.

oThongathi only has one shopping centre which is Ganies Mall in the CBD and the remainder of its retail sector is purely based on the string of retail stores and services in the CBD. However, the new oThongathi Mall which once collapsed in 2013 during construction is currently being reconstructed in the same plot of land as previously and is expected to be completed towards the end of 2022.

oThongathi is home to Tongaat Hulett, one of the largest sugar producers in Africa which has its headquarters located just outside the town and owns and operates the Maidstone Sugar Mill which is located on the northern banks of the uThongathi River and is one of South Africa's first sugar mills – completed in 1850.

Culture & Religion 
oThongathi is home to numerous cultural and religious organisations and buildings. These include:

 Brake Village Sri Siva Soobramaniar Alayam
 Shree Veeraboga Emperumal Temple
 Chinna Thirupathi Venkataswara Devasthanam

Transport

Air 
King Shaka International Airport is the nearest airport to oThongathi, located approximately 8 km south-east of the town via the R102 and M65. The airport offers several flights to towns and cities domestically in South Africa as well as internationally to Doha, Dubai, Harare and Istanbul.

Rail 
oThongathi has three railway stations including its main railway station, Tongaat Central Station located in the CBD adjacent the taxi terminal, Flamingo Heights Station to the south and Tongaat Station to the north in Tongaat Industrial. oThongathi is served by the commuter railway service of Metrorail and lies on the North Coast Line which connects the town to Umhlali, Groutville, Shakaskraal and KwaDukuza in the north-east and Verulam, Mount Edgecombe and Phoenix, Durban, Amanzimtoti, Kingsburgh, Umkomaas and Scottburgh in the south-east.

Road 
The R102 (Gopalall Hurbans Road) runs through oThongathi as its thoroughfare and was the original N2 serving the same function before the construction of the highway. The R102 runs through the CBD of oThongathi and links the town to King Shaka International Airport and Durban in the south-west via Verulam and Mount Edgecombe and to KwaDukuza in the north-east via Umhlali and Shakaskraal. The R102 can be used an alternative route to uMhlanga, Durban, Ballito (via M4 near Compensation) and KwaDukuza for motorists avoiding the tolled N2 highway.

oThongathi also has access to other arterial routes such as the N2 highway, R614 and M43.

The N2 North Coast Toll Route is a tolled national highway that bypasses oThongathi to the east and links the town to Ballito and KwaDukuza in the north-east and Durban in the south-west. Access to the N2 from oThongathi can be obtained through the M43 uShukela Drive interchange (Exit 202) where the oThongathi Mainline and Ramp Toll Plazas are located.

The R614 is a regional route that begins in the north of oThongathi and links to Wartburg to the north-west and to the city of Pietermaritzburg to the west (via the R33). This route is used as an alternative for residents of the North Coast to connect to Pietermaritzburg and the Midlands instead of travelling down the N2 to Durban and then using the N3 highway from Durban to Pietermaritzburg.

The M43 uShukela Drive (previously Watson Highway) links oThongathi from its CBD to the N2 interchange (Exit 202), Westbrook and the M4 in the east which further links to Ballito in the north-east and eMdloti, uMhlanga and Durban in the south-east.

Water crisis 
In April 2022, floods caused by abnormal heavy rainfall struck the Greater Durban region and one of the worst affected places in the region was oThongathi. The oThongathi Waterworks Treatment Plant's poorly maintained infrastructure was exacerbated by the floods which caused extensive damage to the oThongathi Waterworks Treatment Plant leaving many residents without water supply. 

Although water tankers had been sent to oThongathi, they were reported to inconsistent further sparking protests around oThongathi even in the neighbouring township of Hambanathi where it was reported that even waterborne diseases began to flourish. 

Towards the end of August 2022, Water and Sanitation Minister, Senzo Mchunu announced that there would be a tie-in to the Mamba Ridge pipe that will assist to supply water from the Hazelmere Dam, near Verulam to oThongathi.

After more than 200 days of water shortages, towards mid-November 2022, the oThongathi Waterworks Treatment Plant was fully repaired, and water supply was to implemented into phases to complete the commissioning of the oThongathi Water Works with the southern areas of oThongathi receiving water supply first before other areas.

Notable people
Ahmed Amla, cricketer
Cecil Pullan, cricketer
Colin Munro, cricketer
Hashim Amla, cricketer
Katharine Saunders, botanical illustrator
Kimeshan Naidoo, entrepreneur
Prenelan Subrayen, cricketer
 Quarraisha Abdool Karim, scientist was born here in 1960. 
Thandeka Zulu, actress and musician
Thomas Hassall, Australian politician
Two-Boys Gumede, footballer

Notes and references

Citations

Sources

Further reading

External links
Vishwaroop Temple and Dharmashala
Jugannath Puri Temple
KZN: A Photographic and Historical Record
Architectural Impact Assessment for properties affected by the proposed Tongaat Hulett uShukela Highway Project, Tongaat, eThekwini Metropolitan Council

Populated places in eThekwini Metropolitan Municipality
Former Indian townships in South Africa
Townships in KwaZulu-Natal